The 2023 Merdeka Tournament  will be the 42nd edition of the tournament which is organized by Football Association of Malaysia (FAM). The tournament is scheduled to take place in October 2023 which will feature four participants.

Participating nations
The FIFA Rankings of participating national teams as of 22 December 2022.

Venue
All matches will be played in the following venue.

Standings
<onlyinclude>
<onlyinclude>

Matches

References

Mer
 Football in Malaysia
2023 in Asian football